The 2006 Sacramento State Hornets football team represented California State University, Sacramento as a member of the Big Sky Conference during the 2006 NCAA Division I FCS football season. Led by Steve Mooshagian in fourth and final season as head coach, Sacramento State compiled an overall record of 4–7 with a mark of 4–4 in conference play, placing fifth in the Big Sky. The team was outscored by its opponents 288 to 168 for the season. The Hornets played home games at Hornet Stadium in Sacramento, California.

Mooshagian finished his tenure as Sacramento State with record of 11–33, for a .333 winning percentage.

Schedule

References

Sacramento State
Sacramento State Hornets football seasons
Sacramento State Hornets football